Edward Conolly may refer to:

 Edward Conolly (judge) (1822–1908), New Zealand politician and judge
 Edward Michael Conolly (1786–1849), Irish Member of Parliament

See also
 Edward Connolly (disambiguation)